Ulysses S. Grant (1822–1885) was the president of the United States from 1869 to 1877 and a commanding general in the Union Army during the American Civil War.

Ulysses S. Grant may also refer to:

 Ulysses S. Grant Jr. (1852–1929), lawyer, son of Ulysses S. Grant
 Ulysses S. Grant III (1881–1968), general, grandson of Ulysses S. Grant and nephew of Ulysses S. Grant Jr.
 Ulysses S. Grant IV (1893–1977), palaeontologist, son of Ulysses S. Grant Jr. and cousin of Ulysses S. Grant III
 Ulysses Sherman Grant (1867–1932), geologist
 USS Ulysses S. Grant, a submarine

See also

 
 Presidency of Ulysses S. Grant
 , several ships of the U.S. Navy
 President Grant (disambiguation)
 General Grant (disambiguation)
 Ulysses (disambiguation)
 Grant (disambiguation)